Dehrisaray is a town in Dhar district in the Malwa zone portion of the Madhya Pradesh state of India.  It is also known as Ghatabillod .

Geography
The Chambal river flows through the town.

Location
National Highway 47 and State Highway 31 passes through Ghatabillod. It is at a distance of 35 km from Indore 25 km from Dhar and 95 km from Ujjain and Ratlam. The nearest airport is Devi Ahilyabai Holkar International Airport at Indore.

Economy 
There are many factories in this town like National Steel and Agro Industries Ltd., Bajrang Agro Industries & Tirupati Starch & Chemicals Ltd., IVRS, Jyoti overseas etc.

References

External links
 About Ghat Bilod
 Satellite map of Ghat Bilod

Cities and towns in Dhar district